Electric President is a Jacksonville, Florida musical group started in 2003 by Ben Cooper and Alex Kane. Both were in Helicopter Project prior to its breakup though no music from this group was ever released. Afterwards the pair decided to continue to make music together. They subsequently completed three albums in six months. Ben Cooper is also a member of Radical Face (Formerly known as Radical Face Versus Phalex Sledgehammer), Iron Orchestra, and Mother's Basement. The Electric President tracks and most of Ben Cooper's projects are recorded in a tool shed in back of his house that he has converted into a recording studio.

Electric President's first release was a pseudo-eponymous album (named "Self-Titled" rather than "Electric President") in early 2006. They gained limited mainstream fame after their music was featured on Fox Network's hit show The OC. At the end of the thirteenth episode of season three, titled "The Pot Stirrer", the song "Insomnia" is prominently featured in the closing sequence.

Electric President's self-titled debut album, S/T, was released in 2006 on German electronica label Morr Music.

The record Sleep Well was released June 9, 2008 for Europe and June 24, 2008 for the US. In mid-April 2008, the album leaked on file-sharing networks.

In 2009 Electric President left Morr Music and released their third album, The Violent Blue, with Fake Four Inc. The album was largely made up of songs left over from the making of the group's previous album, Sleep Well. After The Violent Blue, Electric President went into hiatus as Alex Kane wanted to further his career and Ben Cooper focused on other projects, like Radical Face.

Electric President's mix of glitch, electronica and indie songwriting has been compared to The Postal Service, Styrofoam, The Weakerthans and Anticon's cLOUDDEAD.

In 2013, Ben Cooper announced on the Radical Face website that himself and Alex were planning a fourth Electric President album. He also hinted that it could be a dance record.

Releases

You Have the Right to Remain Awesome EP 
Alex and Ben's first set of recordings with the name Electric President.  The EP consisted of five songs, four of which being released between two volumes (2004).

Track Listing
Vol. 1
"Good Ol' Boys" - 4:05
"Dotted Lines" - 4:06
Vol. 2
"I'm Not the Lonely Son (I'm the Ghost)" - 3:17
"Wearing Influence on Our Sleeve-less T-shirts" - 3:49

S/T 
The first official album to be recorded by Electric President was S/T (2006).

Track Listing
"Good Morning, Hypocrite" - 5:24
"Insomnia" - 4:17
"Ten Thousand Lines" - 5:35
"Grand Machine No. 12" - 4:03
"Hum" - 2:20
"Snow on Dead Neighborhoods" - 3:26
"Some Crap About the Future" - 5:06
"Metal Fingers" - 3:50
"We Were Never Built to Last" - 4:28
"Farewell" - 7:56

Sleep Well 
Released in June 2008.

Track Listing
"Monsters" - 4:36
"Bright Mouths" - 4:48
"We Will Walk Through Walls" - 4:31
"Graves and the Infinite Arm" - 4:39
"Adrift in Space, or Whatever" - 1:20
"Ether" - 5:10
"Robophobia" - 4:35
"Lullaby" - 5:36
"It's Like a Heartbeat, Only it Isn't" - 1:02
"All the Bones" - 5:16
"It's an Ugly Life" - 5:52
"When it's Black" - 5:12

The Violent Blue 
Released with an American label, Fake Four, The Violent Blue (2010) became the first American album by Electric President.

Track Listing
"The Ocean Floor" - 5:03
"Mr. Gone" - 3:06
"Safe and Sound" - 4:07
"Feathers" - 3:23
"Nightmare No. 5 or 6" - 5:48
"The Violent Blue" - 4:14
"Circles" - 4:12
"Elegant Disasters" - 4:31
"Eat Shit and Die" - 3:09
"All the Distant Ships" - 8:39

Discography 
 You Have the Right to Remain Awesome EP (2004)
 S/T (24 January 2006, Morr Music)
 Sleep Well (24 June 2008, Morr Music)
 The Violent Blue (23 February 2010, Fake Four Inc.)

Music videos

External links 
 

Electronic music groups from Florida
Musical groups established in 2003
Morr Music artists